Clemente Rafael Álvarez (born May 18, 1968) is a Venezuelan former catcher in Major League Baseball who played for the Philadelphia Phillies in the 2000 MLB season. Listed at 5' 11", 180 lb., he batted and threw right handed.

In two games as a backup, Álvarez went 1-for-5, for a .200 batting average, with one run scored.

In between, he played winter ball with the Navegantes del Magallanes club of the Venezuelan Professional Baseball League, over the course of 19 seasons, spanning 1986–2004.

Following his playing career, Álvarez coached for Magallanes and the Tigres de Aragua.

See also
 List of players from Venezuela in Major League Baseball

External links

Clemente Alvarez at SABR (Baseball BioProject)
Clemente Alvarez at Pura Pelota (Venezuelan Professional Baseball League)

1968 births
Living people
Birmingham Barons players
Clearwater Phillies players
Gulf Coast White Sox players
Major League Baseball catchers
Major League Baseball players from Venezuela
Minor league baseball coaches
Nashville Sounds players
Navegantes del Magallanes players
Ottawa Lynx players
People from Anzoátegui
Philadelphia Phillies players
Reading Phillies players
Sarasota White Sox players
Scranton/Wilkes-Barre Red Barons players
South Bend White Sox players
Utica Blue Sox players
Venezuelan baseball coaches
Venezuelan expatriate baseball players in Canada
Venezuelan expatriate baseball players in the United States
Winston-Salem Warthogs players